Gene M. Roland (September 15, 1921 in Dallas – August 11, 1982 in New York City) was an American jazz composer and musician. He played many instruments during his career, but was most significant as an arranger/composer and for his association with Stan Kenton. Roland was one of only two arrangers to write for Kenton, in all four decades of the band's existence, the other being Ken Hanna.

Life and work
Roland, who gained a degree in music from the University of North Texas College of Music, first met Kenton in 1944, playing fifth trumpet and contributing arrangements. He worked briefly with Lionel Hampton and Lucky Millinder and then rejoined Kenton in 1945, this time as a trombonist and writer (he arranged the hit "Tampico").

Roland played piano and wrote for a group in 1946 that included Stan Getz, Zoot Sims, Jimmy Giuffre and Herbie Steward and would lead to Woody Herman's Four Brothers Second Herd. In the late 1940s, Roland played trombone with Georgie Auld, trumpet with Count Basie, Charlie Barnet and Lucky Millinder and contributed charts for the big bands of Claude Thornhill and Artie Shaw. After leading a giant rehearsal band in 1950 that included Dizzy Gillespie and Charlie Parker, Roland wrote for Kenton in 1951, Dan Terry in 1954, and Woody Herman from 1956 to 1958, for whom he contributed 65 arrangements. Roland was a major force in Kenton's mellophonium band of the early 1960s, not only writing for the ensemble but performing as one of the mellophoniums; he also occasionally doubled on soprano sax with the orchestra.

Roland remained active as a writer in the 1960s and 1970s, working with the Radiohus Orchestra in Copenhagen (1967) and contributing charts to Kenton as well as Dan Terry's D.T.B.B.B. album (Metronome Records, 1981); he also played trumpet, piano and tenor with his own groups. In addition to writing an entire album for Kenton, Roland led his 1950 rehearsal band on a Spotlite release (Parker is one of his sidemen), led half of an album (recorded in 1957 and 1959) for Dawn Records in which he plays trumpet, and arranged a 1963 octet record for Brunswick Records.

Discography

As leader
 Jazzville Vol. 4 (Dawn, 1957)

As sideman
With Stan Kenton
 Stan Kenton Classics (Capitol, 1952)
 The Kenton Era (Capitol, 1955)
 A Merry Christmas! (Capitol, 1961)
 Kenton's West Side Story (Capitol, 1961)
 The Romantic Approach in the Ballad Style of Stan Kenton (Capitol, 1961)
 Sophisticated Approach (Capitol, 1962)
 Stan Kenton! Tex Ritter! (Capitol, 1962) 
 Adventures in Blues (Capitol, 1963)
 The Uncollected Stan Kenton and His Orchestra 1944-1945 Vol. 4 (Hindsight, 1979)

With others
 June Christy, June Time (Swing House, 1981)
 Stan Getz, Zoot Sims, Paul Quinichette, Wardell Grey, Tenors Anyone? (Dawn, 1958)
 Jimmy Knepper, A Swinging Introduction to Jimmy Knepper (Bethlehem 1957)
 Lucky Millinder, Cab Calloway, Awful Natural (RCA, 1977)
 Rita Reys, Sylvia Pierce & Peggy Serra, New Voices (Dawn, 1957)
 Tom Talbert, 1946–1949 (Sea Breeze, 1995)

References

External links
 Gene Roland A Composer/Arranger For All The Right Reasons and Seasons
 Stan Kenton: Progressive Concepts in Jazz
 Stan Kenton's Mellophonium Band
 Biography in Handbook of Texas

American jazz composers
American male jazz composers
American music arrangers
1921 births
1982 deaths
People from Dallas
University of North Texas College of Music alumni
20th-century American composers
Jazz musicians from Texas
20th-century American male musicians
20th-century jazz composers